Om Vellimalai is a 2023 Indian Tamil-language comedy drama film directed by Om Vijay and starring Super R. Subramanian, Veera Subash and Anju Krishna in the lead roles. It was released on 24 February 2023.

Cast 

Super R. Subramanian
Veera Subash
Anju Krishna as Manonmani 
Giriraj
Vijaykumar
Charrles Pandian
Kaviraj
Palanichami

Production
Super R Subramanyan, who had played pivotal roles in films including Kadhalum Kadandhu Pogum (2016), Rajini Murugan (2016) and Jai Bhim (2021), was cast in his first lead role. The film was described prior to release as a "social dramedy about siddhargal".

Reception 
The film was released on 24 February 2023 across Tamil Nadu. A critic from Dina Thanthi gave the film a mixed review, while praising some scenes from the film. A critic from The Hindu gave the film a negative review, citing the director could have conceived scenes differently. A reviewer from Dina Thanthi gave the film a largely positive review.

References

External links 
 

 2023 films
 2020s Tamil-language films